Percy Marshall Young (17 May 19129 May 2004) was a British musicologist, editor, organist, composer, conductor and teacher.

Young was born in Northwich, Cheshire. His father was twice mayor of Northwich. Young was educated at the local Sir John Deane's Grammar School, from where he won a scholarship to Christ's Hospital, Horsham, and subsequently, in 1930, an organ scholarship to Selwyn College, Cambridge, where he read English, Music and History (studying composition under Cyril Rootham). After graduation, he completed a doctorate (Mus.D.) at Trinity College, Dublin. From 1934 to 1937 he was a director of music at Stranmillis Teacher Training College in Belfast. From 1937 to 1944, Young was a Musical Adviser to Stoke-on-Trent Local Education Authority. After that, he became director of music at Wolverhampton College of Technology, a position he would occupy from 1944 to 1966. From 1998 until his death in 2004, Young was an Honorary Fellow of Selwyn College, Cambridge.

Young published more than 50 books. Among those are biographies of musicians such as George Frideric Handel (1947), Ralph Vaughan Williams (1953), Sir Edward Elgar (1955), Robert Schumann (1957), Zoltán Kodály (1964), Sir Arthur Sullivan (1971) and Sir George Grove (1980).  For younger readers he also wrote a series on composers such as Handel, Wolfgang Amadeus Mozart, Ludwig van Beethoven and Benjamin Britten.

Young published a suite from an unfinished opera by Elgar, The Spanish Lady. A chapter of his book Elgar, O. M. includes letters and a synopsis of the play, with the characters and musical sketches described.

His own compositions include: "Virgin's Slumber Song" (1932), From a Child's Garden (Robert Louis Stevenson; 1941), Passacaglia for violin and piano (1931), Fugal Concerto in G minor for 2 pianos and strings (1951), and Elegy for String Orchestra (1960).

Young was also an avid football fan and historian, writing several histories of league clubs, including Wolverhampton Wanderers (Centenary Wolves 1877-1977) and Manchester United (Heinemann 1960), plus a history of the game itself (A History of British Football).  Young was also briefly a Labour councillor in Wolverhampton, gaining the Wednesfield Heath ward from the Conservatives in a by-election in April 1974 and representing it until defeated in May 1976.

After the death of his first wife, Netta, Young married Renee Morris, who survived him with three sons and a daughter of his first marriage.

Young's archive is held at the Cadbury Research Library, University of Birmingham.

Notes

External links
 (Obituary 14 May 2004 The Independent) Retrieved 23 February 2018

Bibliography

Young, Percy M. (1971). Sir Arthur Sullivan. London: J. M. Dent & Sons. .

1912 births
2004 deaths
Fellows of Selwyn College, Cambridge
People educated at Sir John Deane's College
People educated at Christ's Hospital
People from Northwich
British writers
20th-century British musicologists
Handel scholars